Chamber Symphony is a 1992 composition for a 15-member chamber orchestra by American composer John Adams, inspired by Arnold Schoenberg's Chamber Symphony No. 1, Op. 9. It is a three-movement work that takes about 23 minutes to perform.

History
It was commissioned by the Gerbode Foundation of San Francisco for the San Francisco Contemporary Music Players but premiered by the Schönberg Ensemble in The Hague, Netherlands, on 17 January 1993. The commissioners gave the American premiere on 12 April 1993. The composer describes his inspiration as follows:

Chamber Symphony was first recorded with the London Sinfonietta, conducted by the composer, in 1994, followed by the Ensemble Moderne in 1997, the Absolute Ensemble in 1999, and the Orchestre Philharmonique de Montpellier in 2000. More recently, the Aurora Orchestra recorded the piece on Road Trip, its album of American music.

Music
The composer describes the piece as "shockingly difficult to play ... [since] instruments are asked to negotiate unreasonably difficult passages and alarmingly fast tempi, often to the inexorable click of the trap set." Adams thought the first movement so difficult that he initially entitled it "Discipliner et Punir". This may also have been a reference to Michel Foucault's 1975 book Discipline and Punish.

As finally published, however, the movements are:

Instrumentation 
The instrumentation is similar to that of Schoenberg's Chamber Symphony No. 1. Specifically, Chamber Symphony is written for:

 1 Flute (doubling Piccolo)
 1 Oboe
 1 Clarinet in E (doubling Clarinets in B and A)
 1 Bass Clarinet (doubling Clarinet in B)
 1 Bassoon
 1 Contrabassoon (doubling Bassoon)

 1 Horn in F
 1 Trumpet in C
 1 Trombone

 1 Synthesizer

 1 Trap Set

 1 Violin
 1 Viola
 1 Cello
 1 Double Bass

References

Compositions by John Adams (composer)
1992 compositions
Compositions for chamber orchestra